Lomont-sur-Crête (literally Lomont on Ridge) is a commune in the Doubs department in the Bourgogne-Franche-Comté region in eastern France.

Population

Economy
A third of the village is involved in agriculture. It also has the only cheese factory in the canton that produces Comté, a hard cheese made from cow's milk that is similar to Gruyère.

See also
 Communes of the Doubs department

References

External links

 Lomont-sur-Crète on the intercommunal Web site of the department 

Communes of Doubs